Sage Sohier is an American photographer and educator.

Biography 
Sohier teaches photography for years in different educational institutions, serving as assistant professor in Massachusetts College of Art.
She was lecturer on Visual and Environmental Studies in Harvard University from 1991 till 2003, Assistant Professor of Art in Wellesley College from 1997 till 1999. She was also teaching in Rhode Island School of Design, Massachusetts College of Art and School of the Boston Museum of Fine Arts.

Sage Sohier works are part of many public collections, including Addison Gallery of American Art, Brooklyn Museum of Art, Cleveland Museum of Art, DeCordova Museum, Fogg Art Museum, MIT List Visual Arts Center, Boston Museum of Fine Arts, Houston Museum of Fine Arts, New York Museum of Modern Art, Nelson-Atkins Museum of Art, Portland Art Museum, Princeton University Art Museum, Rose Art Museum, San Francisco Museum of Modern Art.

Sage Sohier received a lot of publicity for her series of gay couples in home environment. She started to work on this project in 1980 at the time of AIDS crisis.

Awards 
 Massachusetts Artists Foundation photography fellowship, 1979
 National Endowment for the Arts photography fellowship, 1980-1981
 John Simon Guggenheim Memorial Foundation fellowship, 1984-1985
 Massachusetts Council on the Arts and Humanities “Massproductions“ grant, 1987-1989
 Massachusetts Artists Foundation photography fellowship, 1989
 No Strings Foundation grant, 2008-2009

Exhibitions

Solo 

 Gallery "Arte Contemporaneo," Mexico City, 1986
 The Tartt Gallery, Washington, D.C., 1986
 Blue Sky Gallery, Portland, OR, 1988, "At Home with Themselves"
 San Francisco Camerawork, 1988, "At Home with Themselves"
 Vision Gallery, Boston, MA, 1988, "At Home with Themselves"
 Addison Gallery of American Art, Andover, MA, 1990, "At Home with Themselves"
 Museum of Contemporary Photography, Columbia College, Chicago IL, 1990, "At Home with Themselves"
 The Houston Center for Photography, 1990, "At Home with Themselves"
 Blue Sky Gallery, Portland, OR, 1994, "Peaceable Kingdom"
 Retrospective, University of Akron, OH, 1997
 Hampshire College, Amherst, MA, 1998
 Bernard Toale Gallery, Boston, MA, 2004, "Perfectible Worlds"
 The Center for Photography at Woodstock, NY, 2006, "Perfectible Worlds"
 Blue Sky Gallery, Portland, OR, 2007, "Perfectible Worlds"
Foley Gallery, New York, NY, 2008, "Perfectible Worlds"
 Houston Center for Photography, 2008, "Perfectible Worlds"
 San Francisco Airport Museum, 2009, "Perfectible Worlds"
 Jerome Liebling Center, Hampshire College, November 2013, "About Face"
 Blue Sky Gallery, Portland, OR, August, 2013, "About Face"
 Foley Gallery, New York, NY, April, 2013, "About Face."
 Carroll and Sons gallery, Boston, MA, January 2013, "About Face"
 Blue Sky Gallery, Portland, OR, October, 2014, "At Home With Themselves: Same-Sex Couples in 1980s America"
 Carroll and Sons Gallery, Boston, MA, February–March 2015, "At Home With Themselves: Same-Sex Couples in 1980s America"
Foley Gallery, New York, NY, November - January 2018, "Witness to Beauty"
Foley Gallery, New York, NY, April - May 2019, "Immersed and Submerged"

Group 
 Addison Gallery of American Art, Andover, MA, 1982, "New England Perambulations"
 Light Gallery, NY, 1982, "New Women/New Work"
 Museum of Modern Art, NY, 1984, Photographs from the Collection/Opening of the new galleries
 Institute of Contemporary Art, Boston, MA, 1985, "Boston Now Photography"
 Aperture traveling exhibition, 1987, "Mothers and Daughters"
 Art Institute of Chicago, 1989, "American Stories", three-person show.
 Berlin Art Institute, Berlin, Germany, 1988, "AIDS" exhibition
 The Tartt Gallery, Washington, D.C., 1991, four-person show
 Museum of Modern Art, NY, 1991, "Pleasures and Terrors of Domestic Comfort"
 Basel Art Fair 1994
 The Friends of Photography, San Francisco, 1996, "Secrets"
 Davis Museum, Wellesley College, 1996, "Rules of the Game"
 Wooster Gardens (Brent Sikkema) Gallery, New York, 1996, three-person show
 Bernard Toale Gallery, 1999, "Boston Women in Photography"
 The DeCordova Museum, Lincoln, MA, 2000–2001, "Photography in Boston, 1955-85"
 Addison Gallery of American Art, Andover, MA, 2001, "In the Street: Photography from the Collection"
 International Center of Photography, New York, NY,2003, "How Human: Life in the Post-Genome Era"
 Kathleen Ewing Gallery, Washington, D.C, 2004, "Dog Days Dog Show"
 The DeCordova Museum, Lincoln, MA, 2004, "Self-Evidence: Identity in Contemporary Art"
 Clifford Art Gallery, Colgate University, Hamilton, NY, 2005, "Suddenly Older"
 Photographic Resource Center, Boston, MA, 2005–2006, "Group Portrait"
 Carroll and Sons, Boston, MA, 2010, "Familiar Bodies"
 Museum of Modern Art, New York, NY, 2010–2011, "Pictures by Women: A History of Modern Photography"
 Nicolaysen Art Museum, Casper, WY, 2011, "Living History"
 Nelson-Atkins Museum, Kansas City, MO, August, 2013, "About Face: Contemporary Portraiture"
 Portland Art Museum, Portland, OR, October 2014-January 2015, "Blue Sky: The Oregon Center for the Photographic Arts at 40"

References

External links 
 

American photographers
Artists from Boston
Harvard University alumni
Living people
People from Washington, D.C.
Year of birth missing (living people)